Analampotsy is a town and commune in Madagascar. It belongs to the district of Mananara Nord, which is a part of Analanjirofo Region. The population of the commune was estimated to be approximately 16,987 in 2018.

It's located north of Fenoarivo Atsinanana (Fenerive Est) on the  Route Nationale No.5 between Maroantsetra and Toamasina just after the Maningory River bridge.

References and notes 

Populated places in Analanjirofo